Amachavadi  is a village in the southern state of Karnataka, India. It is located in the Chamarajanagar taluk of Chamarajanagar district in Karnataka.

The village is house to many small temples, Maastigallu and Veeragallu in the village, which are memorial stones for slain warriors.

Demographics
The village has population of 7221 of which 3524 are males while 3697 are females as per Population Census 2011.

See also
 Chamarajanagar
 Districts of Karnataka

References

External links
 http://Chamarajanagar.nic.in/

Villages in Chamarajanagar district